Stenella pittospori is a species of anamorphic fungi.

References

External links

pittospori
Fungi described in 2007